Margit Manstad (21 July 1902 – 23 March 1996) was a Swedish actress. She was frequently cast in vampish roles.

Selected filmography
 Anna-Clara and Her Brothers (1923)
 A Maid Among Maids (1924)
 The Lady of the Camellias (1925)
 Getting Married (1926)
 She Is the Only One (1926)
 His English Wife (1927)
 Angst (1928)
 Because I Love You (1928)
 Parisiennes (1928)
 Sweet Pepper (1929)
 The Alley Cat (1929)
 Say It with Music (1929)
 The Realm of the Rye (1929)
 The Two of Us (1930)
 The Storholmen Brothers (1932)
 Modern Wives (1932)
 What Do Men Know? (1933)
 The Atlantic Adventure (1934)
 Mother Gets Married (1937)
 Her Melody (1940)
 The Bjorck Family (1940)
 Nygifta (1941)
 Lasse-Maja (1941)
 In Paradise (1941)
 Sexlingar (1942)
 Adventurer (1942)
 Idel ädel adel (1945)

Bibliography
 Bergfelder, Tim & Harris, Sue & Street, Sarah. Film Architecture and the Transnational Imagination: Set Design in 1930s European Cinema. Amsterdam University Press, 2007.
 Iverson, Gunnar, Soderbergh Widding, Astrid & Soila, Tytti. Nordic National Cinemas. Routledge, 2005.

Further reading

References

External links

1902 births
1996 deaths
Swedish film actresses
Swedish stage actresses
Swedish silent film actresses
20th-century Swedish actresses
Actresses from Stockholm